John O'Gaunt railway station was a railway station serving the villages of Twyford, John O'Gaunt and Burrough on the Hill in Leicestershire, England. on the Great Northern and London and North Western Joint Railway. It opened in 1879 as Burrow & Twyford and was renamed John O'Gaunt in 1883. It closed to regular traffic in 1953. To the south of the station was Marefield Junction.

References

Disused railway stations in Leicestershire
Railway stations in Great Britain opened in 1879
Railway stations in Great Britain closed in 1953
Former Great Northern Railway stations
Former London and North Western Railway stations
1879 establishments in England
1953 disestablishments in England